Identity is the only album by Zee, a short-lived side project of Pink Floyd keyboardist Rick Wright, a duo partnership consisting of Wright and Dave Harris of New Romantic outfit Fashion, released in 1984. Wright later stated that he felt Identity was an "experimental mistake" that should never have been released. The album was written and produced by Wright and Harris and all the lyrics were penned by Harris.

The album makes heavy use of the Fairlight CMI, a musical synthesizer popularized in the 1980s.  This creates a very electronic sound that persists through every track.

"Confusion" was released as a single with "Eyes of a Gypsy" as the B-side.

In 2019, the album was reissued with bonus tracks and a new cover art.

Track listing

Non-album tracks
 "Confusion" (Single Mix) – 3:36
 "Confusion" (12" Mix) – 6:21
 "Eyes of a Gypsy" (Dub) (from the "Confusion" 12" UK single) – 4:11

Personnel
Richard Wright: keyboards, synthesized percussion, Fairlight, backing vocals
Dave "Dee" Harris: guitars, keyboards, percussion, Fairlight, lead vocals

Production
Produced by Richard Wright and Dave Harris
Engineered and co-produced by Tim Palmer
Overdubs and mixdown by Utopia (London)
Artwork by Dave Harris
Photography by Paul Cox

References

1984 albums
Albums produced by Richard Wright (musician)
Albums produced by Tim Palmer
Harvest Records albums